The United States mixed doubles Olympic curling trials occur every four years, in the year preceding the Winter Olympic Games. These trials have been used to determine the United States representatives in the year's Winter Olympic Games since mixed doubles curling was added to the Olympic program for the 2018 Winter Olympic games.

The 2021 trials were originally announced to be held in Irvine, California, but less than a month before they were to begin the decision was made to move them to Eveleth, Minnesota, due to the ongoing COVID-19 pandemic.

Champions

References

External links
United States Curling Association

Olympic
United States Olympic Trials